The middle cerebellar peduncle (brachium pontis) is a paired structure of the brain. It connects the pons to the cerebellum, with fibres originating from the pontine nucleus and travelling to the opposite hemisphere of the cerebellar cortex. It is supplied by the anterior inferior cerebellar artery (AICA) and branches from the basilar artery. It conveys information from the cerebrum and the pons to the cerebellum.

Structure 
The middle cerebellar peduncle connects the pons to the cerebellum. It only contains fibres from the pons to the cerebellum. The fibers arise from the pontine nucleus, and travel to the opposite hemisphere of the cerebellar cortex. Fibers cross over before entering the middle cerebellar peduncle and the cerebellum.

The fibers of the middle cerebellar peduncle are arranged in three fasciculi: superior, inferior, and deep.
 The superior fasciculus, the most superficial, is derived from the upper transverse fibers of the pons; it is directed backward and lateralward superficial to the other two fasciculi, and is distributed mainly to the lobules on the inferior surface of the cerebellar hemisphere and to the parts of the superior surface adjoining the posterior and lateral margins.
 The inferior fasciculus is formed by the lowest transverse fibers of the pons; it passes under cover of the superior fasciculus and is continued downward and backward more or less parallel with it, to be distributed to the folia on the under surface close to the vermis.
 The deep fasciculus comprises most of the deep transverse fibers of the pons. It is at first covered by the superior and inferior fasciculi, but crosses obliquely and appears on the medial side of the superior, from which it receives a bundle; its fibers spread out and pass to the upper anterior cerebellar folia. The fibers of this fasciculus cover those of the inferior cerebellar peduncle.
The trigeminal nerve (CN V) arises from the lateral pons very close to the middle cerebellar peduncle.

Blood supply 
The middle cerebellar peduncle is supplied by the anterior inferior cerebellar artery (AICA), as well as smaller branches from the basilar artery.

Function 
The middle cerebellar peduncle conveys information from the cerebrum and the pons to the cerebellum.

Clinical significance 
Infarction of the anterior inferior cerebellar artery (AICA) can damage the middle cerebellar peduncle. Diffuse intrinsic pontine glioma may spread from the pons into the middle cerebellar peduncle.

History 
The middle cerebellar peduncle may also be known as the brachium pontis.

Additional images

See also 
 Superior cerebellar peduncle
 Inferior cerebellar peduncle

References

External links 
 

Cerebellar connections
Pons